Holy Bandits is a 1993 album by British folk rock band Oysterband. The album features the original version of the song "When I'm Up (I Can't Get Down)", which became a Canadian top 10 hit for the folk group Great Big Sea in 1997.

Track listing
 "When I'm Up, I Can't Get Down" (Telfer, Prosser, Jones) - 3:30
 "The Road to Santiago" (Telfer, Prosser, Jones) - 3:29
 "I Look for You" (Telfer, Prosser, Jones) - 4:04
 "Gone West" (Telfer, Prosser, Jones) - 4:03
 "We Shall Come Home" (Telfer) - 4:18
 "Cry Cry" (Telfer, Prosser, Jones) - 3:34
 "Here's to You" (Telfer, Prosser, Jones) - 3:15
 "Moving On" (Telfer, Prosser, Jones) - 3:45
 "Rambling Irishman" (Trad.) - 5:03
 "A Fire Is Burning" (Telfer, Prosser, Jones) - 3:18
 "Blood Wedding" (Telfer, Prosser, Jones) - 4:04

References

1993 albums
Oysterband albums